Albert Carreres (born June 13, 1981) is a Spanish cartoonist.

Biography 
Albert Carreres studied drawing at Joso's school in Barcelona. His first drawings as a professional were made for Hand 7, a handball manga written by Sébastien Célimon and published in the Shogun magazine of the Humanoïdes Associés editions in 2007.

He then worked on Cars: The Rookie - prequel to Pixar's cartoon - published by Boom! Studios and a short story on Iron Man, Marvel's hero, for the release of the video game in 2008.

His first collaboration with the studio Makma took place for the comic strip Banc de Touche, written by Edmond Tourriol and Daniel Fernandes. All three volumes were pre-published in the sports newspaper L'Équipe during the 2010 FIFA World Cup.

After that, Albert worked for the US market and Viz Studio. He drew some issues of Voltron Force and Ben 10 Omiverse. He is back in France with Makma Studio for the project Zlatan Style, a humorous cartoon on football, and Urban Rivals, inspired by the online game.

Today, Albert Carreres works within the Makma studio with Edmond Tourriol and Daniel Fernandes on a shonen manga entitled Team Z.

Bibliography

Cartoonist 

 ·        Banc de touche, de 2010 à 2011, éditions Kantik

Vol. 1 : La Bande à Raymond, 2010. 

Vol. 2 : Le Grand Fiasco, 2010. 

Vol. 3 : Spécial O.M., 2011. ISBN

 ·        La France de tout en bas, 2011, éditions Bac@BD 
 ·        Zlatan Style, 2013, éditions HugoBD

Vol. 1 : 2013. 

Vol. 2 : Zlatanc contre le monde, 2014. 

Vol. 3 : Pays de merde, 2015. 

 ·        Urban Rivals, 2014, éditions Kantik

Vol. 1 : Rien ne va plus, 2011. 

 ·        Le Réveil des Bleus, 2016, éditions Hugo BD. 
 ·        Paris Saint-Germain Infinity, depuis 2016, éditions Soleil

Vol. 1 : 2016. 

Vol. 2 : 2017. 

 ·        L’Équipe Z, depuis 2016, éditions Kotoji

Vol. 1 : 2016. 

Vol. 2 : 2017. 

 ·        Neymar Style, 2018, éditions HugoBD

Vol. 1 : 2018. 

 ·        Epic Lanes – An Esports Adventure, 2018, éditions Hachette

Vol. 1 : 2018.

References

External links 
 Albert Carreres official website

Spanish cartoonists
1981 births
Living people